Kostrzyn nad Odrą (literally Kostrzyn upon Oder;) is a town in Gorzów County, Lubusz Voivodeship in western Poland, close to the border with Germany.

Geography
The town is situated within the historic Lubusz Land (Ziemia Lubuska) region at the confluence of the Oder and Warta rivers, on the western rim of the extended Warta mires.

Until the end of World War II and the implementation of the Oder–Neisse line in 1945, the municipal area also comprised the Küstrin-Kietz suburb on the west bank of the Oder river, which today is part of the German Küstriner Vorland municipality. The former town centre, the Kostrzyn fortress located on the headland between the Oder and Warta rivers, was destroyed by the Red Army as an act of revenge weeks before the end of WW2 and not rebuilt. Today Kostrzyn's central area is located around Kostrzyn railway station east of the Warta mouth.

History

Middle Ages

Settled since the Bronze Age, the area from about 960 to 1261 was held by the Piast dukes and kings of Poland, who had a gord laid out in the borderlands with the Pomeranian tribes in the north. Duke Mieszko I used Kostrzyn's strategic location as a staging area during his expedition to the Battle of Cedynia in 972. Likewise, his successor Bolesław I the Brave from 1002 also prepared here for conquests and battles in the German–Polish War against King Henry II.

In 1223 the Greater Polish prince Władysław Odonic granted the fortress to the Knights Templar. The name of the town was first mentioned in 1232 in a Polish letter by the Lubusz bishop Wawrzyniec to the Knights Templar, in which the old Slavic name Cozsterine (hence the later German name Küstrin) was mentioned. In the 12th century it developed into a fortified castellany and a Polish taxation post, however, together with Lubusz Land it was seized by the Ascanian margraves of Brandenburg in 1261 and incorporated into their Neumark territory east of the Oder river. By 1300 the town had received Magdeburg town rights from Margrave Albert III of Brandenburg and started to grow rapidly, owing largely to trade on the rivers.

In 1373 the town became part of the Lands of the Bohemian Crown (or Czech Lands), ruled by the Luxembourg dynasty. In 1402, the Luxembourgs reached an agreement with Poland in Kraków, under which Poland was to buy and reincorporate Kostrzyn and the surrounding region, but eventually the Luxembourgs sold the town to the Teutonic Order. After the Thirteen Years’ War broke out in 1454, the Teutonic Knights sold the town to Brandenburg in order to raise funds for war against Poland.

Modern era

In 1535–1571 the town was the seat of John of Brandenburg-Küstrin, who made it the capital of the Neumark region and built a castle. With time this castle was expanded into a fortress, one of the largest such facilities in the region. While still crown prince, Frederick the Great was imprisoned in the fortress, from which he witnessed the execution of his friend Hans Hermann von Katte on 6 November 1730. The town was besieged by the Russians during the Seven Years' War. Captured by the French in 1806, Küstrin was occupied by a French military garrison for the remainder of the Napoleonic Wars. During the French retreat from the east in 1814, the town was set on fire and burnt to the ground. The town recovered and became one of the most important railway hubs in the Kingdom of Prussia and later the German Empire. One of the main escape routes for surviving insurgents of the Polish November Uprising from partitioned Poland to the Great Emigration led through the town. In 1857 it was linked to Berlin and Frankfurt (Oder) and in 1875 with Stettin (Szczecin) on the Pomeranian coast. In 1900 its population reached 16,473, including the garrison of the fortress.

In September 1923, the Black Reichswehr attempted to occupy Küstrin but it was suppressed. At the outbreak of World War II Küstrin had 24,000 inhabitants. During the war, the Germans used Polish prisoners of war as forced labourers to build the Stalag III-C POW camp in the present-day district of Drzewice. It housed Polish, French, Serbian, Soviet, Italian, British, American and Belgian POWs. In 1943–45 the town also housed a number of German forced labour camps and a sub-camp of the Sachsenhausen concentration camp. Due to Allied air raids on the railway hub and local factories and its position as a German bridgehead on the east bank of the Oder during the Battle of the Oder-Neisse and the Battle of the Seelow Heights, almost 95% of its buildings were destroyed (including all 32 of the city's factories) and the town was generally deserted. The town was captured by the Red Army on 11 March 1945.

After the war the ruined town became again part of Poland by decision of the Potsdam Conference; Germans remaining in the town were expelled westward in accordance with the Potsdam Agreement. The town was repopulated by Poles, many of whom were refugees from Soviet-annexed former eastern Poland, from where they had been displaced by Soviet authorities in accordance to new borders decided at Yalta Conference, while most were re-settlers from central Poland.

The remnants of the old town within the fortress walls, including the castle in which the young Frederick the Great had been imprisoned, were razed after the war and the bricks used to rebuild Polish cities elsewhere. More recently, plans to rebuild some of the old town in a historical style was considered, but this project appears to be on hold. The section of the town on the west bank of the Oder remained in Germany and is now called Küstrin-Kietz.
Since 2004 Kostrzyn has annually hosted Przystanek Woodstock in the summer, the largest open-air music festival in Europe and one of the largest in the world.

Population in selected years
 1900: 16,473 
 1925: approx. 19,500
 1939: approx. 24,000
 1971: approx. 11,000

Note that the above numbers are based on primary, possibly inaccurate or biased sources.

Sports
It competes in the lower leagues.

Notable people
Jan Latalski (1463–1540), medieval Archbishop of Gniezno 
Kaspar von Barth (1587–1658), philologist
Christian Albert, Burgrave and Count of Dohna (1621–1677), Prussian general
Philipp von Stosch (1691–1757), Prussian antiquarian
Alfred von Tirpitz (1849–1930), German grand admiral
Fedor von Bock (1880–1945), German field marshal
Gerhard Matzky (1894–1983), German general
Joseph Kushner (1922–1985), American property developer
Dariusz Dudka (born 1983), Polish footballer
Grzegorz Wojtkowiak (born 1984), Polish footballer
Łukasz Fabiański (born 1985), Polish footballer

Twin towns – sister cities

Kostrzyn nad Odrą is twinned with:
 Seelow, Germany
 Peitz, Germany
 Sambir, Ukraine

References

External links

Municipal website 
Jewish Community in Kostrzyn nad Odrą on Virtual Shtetl
Google Maps
Webpage of the municipality on the German side of the border 
Gallery of old photos
Information about the fortress Küstrin

 
Cities and towns in Lubusz Voivodeship
Gorzów County
Divided cities
Germany–Poland border crossings